"The Preacher and the Slave" is a song written by Joe Hill in 1911. It was written as a parody of the hymn "In the Sweet By-and-By". Copying or using the musical style of the hymn was also a way to capture the emotional resonance of that style of music and use it for a non-religious purpose. "The Preacher and the Slave" is also a novel written by Wallace Stegner. The Industrial Workers of the World (IWW, also commonly known as the Wobblies) concentrated much of its labor trying to organize migrant workers in lumber and construction camps. When the workers returned to the cities, the Wobblies faced the Salvation Army, which they satirized as the "Starvation Army", who were said to have tried to drown out IWW with their religious music. Hill had first encountered the Salvation Army in Sweden when he was a child.

Several songs were written parodying the Salvation Army's hymns, "The Preacher and the Slave" being the most successful.  In this song, Joe Hill coined the phrase "pie in the sky". The song is often referred to as "Pie in the Sky", or as "Long Haired Preachers" (which was its original title). It was first published in the 4th edition of the Little Red Songbook in 1911. Harry McClintock is credited with being the first person to sing "Long Haired Preachers", a song by Joe Hill, in public. Woody Guthrie was also known to sing this song, as well as Pete Seeger and Utah Phillips.

Lyrics and chords
The following lyrics are from the 19th edition of the Little Red Songbook.
 Verse #1:
 G                          C         G
 Long-haired preachers come out every night 
 G                                       D                
 Try to tell you what's wrong and what's right
 G                        C            G
 But when asked how 'bout something to eat 
 G                   D         G
 They will answer in voices so sweet

 Chorus Type #1:
 G                     D 
 You will eat, bye and bye
 D7                             G
 In that glorious land above the sky 
 G                            C
 Work and pray, live on hay 
            G             D           G
 You'll get pie in the sky when you die

 Verse #2:
 G                  C          G
 And the Starvation Army, they play 
 G                                    D
 And they sing and they clap and they pray 
 G                      C           G
 Till they get all your coin on the drum 
 G                       D             G
 Then they tell you when you're on the bum

 Chorus Type #1

 Verse #3:
 G                C            G
 Holy Rollers and Jumpers come out 
 G                                   D 
 And they holler, they jump and they shout 
 G                  C           G
 Give your money to Jesus, they say 
 G                  D        G      
 He will cure all diseases today

 Chorus Type #1

 Verse #4:
 G                     C            G
 If you fight hard for children and wife
 G                                 D
 Try to get something good in this life 
 G                   C             G
 You're a sinner and bad man, they tell 
 G                     D          G
 When you die you will sure go to hell.

 Chorus Type #1

 Verse #5:
 G                 C           G
 Workingmen of all countries, unite 
 G                                D
 Side by side we for freedom will fight 
 G                      C              G
 When the world and its wealth we have gained 
 G                     D           G
 To the grafters we'll sing this refrain

 Chorus Type #2: 
 G                     D
 You will eat, bye and bye 
 D7                                          G
 When you've learned how to cook and how to fry 
 G                             C
 Chop some wood, 'twill do you good 
 G                      D             G
 Then you'll eat in the sweet bye and bye 
The chorus is sung in a call and response pattern.

See also

 Wobbly lingo

Notes

References
 
 
 Rise Up Singing p. 184.

External links

1911 songs
Musical parodies
Songs critical of religion
Songs with lyrics by Joe Hill (activist)
The Salvation Army
Trade union songs